The 1902 Massachusetts gubernatorial election was held on November 4, 1902. Incumbent Republican Governor W. Murray Crane did not run for re-election. Lt. Governor John L. Bates was elected to succeed him, defeating Democratic nominee William A. Gaston and Socialist John C. Chase.

Party nominations
Lieutenant Governor John L. Bates was nominated by the Republican party by acclamation. William A. Gaston defeated Charles Sumner Hamlin 1004 votes to 232 votes at the Democratic convention.

General election

Results

Governor

See also
 1902 Massachusetts legislature

References

Bibliography

Governor
1902
Massachusetts
November 1902 events